Fresh Start may refer to:
 Fresh Start (album), a 2016 album by Ryan Stevenson
 Fresh Start (comics), 2018 relaunch of Marvel Comics
 Fresh Start (detergent), the first powdered detergent to come in a plastic bottle
 Fresh Start (politics), a 1990s grouping of eurosceptics
 Fresh Start Project, a moderate eurosceptic pressure group founded in 2011
 Fresh Start programme, an educational programme in the United Kingdom
 A Fresh Start, a 1910 American silent short drama
 Bankruptcy discharge